Sheriff Isa (born 10 November 1990 in Sokoto, Nigeria) is a Nigerian football midfielder, who played for Chornomorets Odesa in the Ukrainian Premier League.

Career 
Isa started his career when he signed for Kano Pillars FC before the 2009-2010 season. He was fairly regular and a consistent performer during his first season in the Nigeria Premier League. Then he made a very promising start to the ongoing Nigeria Premier League 2010-2011, scoring two goals during the first 16 rounds of football. In July 2012 he signed a contract with Ukrainian club FC Olimpik.

Isa was a member of the Nigeria national under-17 football team and winner of the 2007 FIFA U-17 World Cup in South Korea.

Honours
FIFA U-17 World Cup: 2007

References

External links 

1990 births
Living people
People from Sokoto
Nigerian footballers
Kano Pillars F.C. players
FC Olimpik Donetsk players
FC Chornomorets Odesa players
Nigerian expatriate footballers
Expatriate footballers in Ukraine
Nigerian expatriate sportspeople in Ukraine
Nigeria youth international footballers
Ukrainian Premier League players
Ukrainian First League players
Association football midfielders